Doug Harvey may refer to:

Doug Harvey (ice hockey) (1924–1989), Canadian National Hockey League player, member of the Hockey Hall of Fame
Doug Harvey (umpire) (1930–2018), member of the Baseball Hall of Fame
Doug Harvey (artist), writer, curator and artist based in Los Angeles